The Thar is a small river of France, in the administrative region Normandie, département de la Manche.

In the Middle Ages the Thar formed the traditional boundary between the Cotentin to the north and the Avranchin to the south.

References

Rivers of France
Rivers of Normandy
Rivers of Manche
0Thar